Brothers in Rhythm are a British electronic music group comprising Dave Seaman, Steve Anderson and Alan Bremner. The group was originally a duo comprising Seaman and Anderson, with Bremner joining later in 1999. They have remixed and/or produced tracks by Lulu, M People, Secret Life, Rebekah Ryan, Seal, Janet Jackson, Michael Jackson, Orchestral Manoeuvres in the Dark, New Order, Dannielle Gaha, Pet Shop Boys, Kylie Minogue, Garbage, Placebo, Alanis Morissette, U2 and many others.

Biography
As Brothers in Rhythm, they hit number one on the U.S. Billboard Hot Dance Club Play chart in 1991 with "Such a Good Feeling". It reached #14 on the UK Singles Chart upon re-issue in September 1991. In 1994, they released the single "Forever and a Day", billed as Brothers in Rhythm present Charvoni, but this was not very successful on the UK Singles Chart, only reaching #51, though it did become a hit in the UK clubs.

Singles

See also
List of Number 1 Dance Hits (United States)
List of artists who reached number one on the US Dance chart

References

External links
 Brothers in Rhythm at Discogs.

Club DJs
English DJs
Remixers
English house music groups
English electronic music groups
British musical trios